Galloisiana sofiae is a species of insect in the family Grylloblattidae. Its type locality is Mount Myoyang, South Korea.

References

Grylloblattidae
Insects of Korea